Jesus Christ Superstar Live in Concert is an American musical television special that was broadcast live on NBC on April 1, 2018 (Easter Sunday) and rebroadcast (from tape) on Easter Sunday 2020, April 12, 2020. Executively produced by Craig Zadan, Neil Meron, Andrew Lloyd Webber, Tim Rice, and Marc Platt, it was a staged concert performance of the 1970 rock opera Jesus Christ Superstar. It received positive reviews from critics but had a smaller viewership than earlier musical specials.

Description and plot

The musical is almost entirely sung-through, with minimal spoken dialogue. The plot is loosely based on the Canonical Gospels' accounts of the last week of the life of Jesus Christ, beginning with the preparation for the arrival of Jesus and his disciples in Jerusalem and ending with the crucifixion.

The disciple Judas Iscariot is worried that Jesus has become too swept up in the adoration of his followers, rather than focusing on his teachings about taking care of the poor, and that his following has grown too large and outspoken, which could soon provoke the wrath of the Roman Empire ("Heaven on Their Minds"). Judas also objects to Jesus spending his time with Mary Magdalene ("What's the Buzz / Strange Thing Mystifying"), who advises Jesus to relax ("Everything's All Right"). Judas's fears prove justified as priests Caiaphas, Annas and more gather and agree that Jesus and his movement must be crushed ("This Jesus Must Die"). Jesus enters Jerusalem filled with exaltation ("Hosanna") until he discovers that his temple has become overrun with unscrupulous merchants and money lenders. Overwhelmed by a throng of people needing his assistance, he tells them to heal themselves ("The Temple"), and his follower Mary Magdalene attempts to calm him. Fearing that Jesus' movement is getting out of control, Judas goes to the Priests and tells them where Jesus will be the following night. The Priests pay him with 30 pieces of silver. Judas arrives at Jesus' location with Roman soldiers and identifies Jesus by kissing him on the cheek. The soldiers arrest Jesus and send him to Caiaphas, then Pontius Pilate, King Herod Antipas, and finally back to Pilate, who condemns him to death on the cross.

Cast and characters

Main

 John Legend as Jesus Christ
 Sara Bareilles as Mary Magdalene
 Brandon Victor Dixon as Judas Iscariot
 Alice Cooper as King Herod
 Norm Lewis as Caiaphas
 Ben Daniels as Pontius Pilate
 Jason Tam as Peter
 Jin Ha as Annas
 Erik Grönwall as Simon Zealotes

Ensemble

 Melody Betts
 Felicia Boswell
 Abby Corrigan
 Micaela Diamond
 Rory Donovan
 Christine Dwyer
 Mike Evariste
 F. Michael Haynie
 Charissa Hogeland
 Bre Jackson
 Mykal Kilgore
 Billy Lewis Jr.
 Justin Gregory Lopez
 Angel Lozada
 Vince Oddo
 Kyle Taylor Parker
 Joel Perez
 Jonah Platt
 Conor Ryan
 Christina Sajous
 Justin Matthew Sargent
 Heath Saunders
 Joey Taranto
 Syndee Winters
 Lauren Zakrin

Dancers

 Chloe Davis
 Timothy Edwards
 Shelby Finnie
 Bahiyah Hibah
 Juel D. Lane
 Terk Lewis
 Mayte Natalio
 Sarah Parker
 Willie Smith III
 Maleek Washington

Musical numbers
The musical numbers from the track list of the soundtrack.

Act I
 "Overture" – Orchestra
 "Heaven on Their Minds" – Judas
 "What's the Buzz / Strange Thing Mystifying" – Judas, Jesus, Mary, and Ensemble
 "Everything's Alright" – Mary, Judas, Jesus, and Ensemble
 "This Jesus Must Die" – Caiaphas, Annas, and Ensemble
 "Hosanna" – Jesus, Caiaphas, and Ensemble
 "Simon Zealotes / Poor Jerusalem" - Simon Zealotes and Ensemble
 "Pilate's Dream" – Pontius Pilate
 "The Temple" - Jesus and Ensemble
 "Everything's Alright (Reprise)" – Jesus and Mary
 "I Don't Know How to Love Him" – Mary
 "Damned for All Time / Blood Money" – Judas, Annas, Caiaphas, and Ensemble

Act II
 "The Last Supper" – Jesus, Judas, and Ensemble
 "Gethsemane (I Only Want to Say)" – Jesus
 "Transition" – Jesus and Judas
 "The Arrest" – Jesus, Peter, Annas, Caiaphas, and Ensemble
 "Peter's Denial" – Peter, Mary, and Ensemble
 "Pilate and Christ" – Pilate, Annas, Jesus, Ensemble
 "King Herod's Song" – Herod and Company
 "Transition After Herod" – Orchestra
 "Could We Start Again, Please?" – Mary and Peter
 "Judas' Death" – Judas, Annas, Caiaphas, and Ensemble
 "Trial Before Pilate (Including the 39 Lashes)" – Pilate, Caiaphas, Jesus, and Ensemble
 "Superstar" – Judas and Ensemble
 "The Crucifixion" – Jesus and Ensemble
 "John Nineteen: Forty One" – Orchestra

Production

Development
On May 10, 2017, it was announced that NBC had selected Jesus Christ Superstar to be their next live musical event. Executive producers were expected to include Craig Zadan, Neil Meron, Marc Platt, Andrew Lloyd Webber, and Tim Rice. In December 2017, it was reported that British theater director David Leveaux would direct and that the show would be performed in front of a live audience at the Marcy Avenue Armory in Williamsburg, Brooklyn. Members of the creative crew included costume designer Paul Tazewell and choreographer Camille A. Brown.

Casting
In December 2017, it was announced that Alice Cooper had been cast as King Herod, with John Legend in the title role. The following month, it was announced that Sara Bareilles would play Mary Magdalene. In February 2018, it was announced that Brandon Victor Dixon, Norm Lewis, Ben Daniels, Jason Tam, Jin Ha and Erik Grönwall had been cast as Judas, Caiaphas, Pontius Pilate, Peter, Annas and Simon Zealotes, respectively. The production included a cast of forty-four actors, including Joel Perez and Lauren Zakrin, and additional dancers.

Filming
The live production included an on-camera audience of about 1,500 people. Some of these extras lined two sides of the stage and formed a mosh pit effect. The production was expected to utilize as many as twelve cameras to film the special. In addition, a full dress rehearsal performance took place on Saturday, March 31, 2018, in front of an invited audience and was recorded. In the event of any difficulties during the live broadcast, the recording served as an emergency backup. It was ultimately not needed.

Marketing
On January 7, 2018, NBC aired the first teaser trailer for the special during their broadcast of the 75th Golden Globe Awards.

Reception

Critical response
Jesus Christ Superstar Live in Concert has been met with an overwhelmingly positive response from critics since it aired. On the review aggregation website Rotten Tomatoes, the production holds a 100% approval rating with an average rating of 8.44/10 based on 26 reviews. The website's critical consensus reads, "Shaking up traditional religious and musical iconography, Jesus Christ Superstar Live in Concert is a sight to be heard, superbly infiltrating the classic source material with originality, rock legend star power, and soulful depth." Metacritic, which uses a weighted average, assigned the production a score of 81 out of 100 based on 13 critics, indicating "universal acclaim".

In a positive review, The New York Timess Noel Murray praised the special saying, "A conceptual and artistic triumph, NBC’s live telecast of Jesus Christ Superstar on Easter Sunday may have finally justified the recent live musical fad on network TV. Some technical flubs and one mixed-bag lead performance aside, the production was genuinely thrilling, taking chances with the staging of a classic but controversial Broadway show, much more daring than previous live musical broadcasts like The Sound of Music or Peter Pan." Offering similar acclaim, The Hollywood Reporters David Rooney said, "But here's the thing: This was a phenomenally balanced production of Jesus Christ Superstar, in which star power was equaled by depth of feeling and characterization in all the principals. And the immediacy of television, with close-ups capable of bringing us in tight on the performers' faces, gave Jesus and Mary Magdalene a complexity that often is missing from conventional productions." Lorraine Ali of The Los Angeles Times also lauded the production saying, "The show was a collision of religion and theater and pop culture that could have been one holy mess. But by the grace of God, or maybe a great cast and lots and lots of expert staging, a great musical became a great TV production." In a more mixed review, Maureen Ryan of Variety said, "This musical threw together glitter, sequins, leather, writhing hotties, a few big performances pitched to the last row, and camerawork that often felt as though it was hopped up on too many lattes. Actually, the ragged edges of a unifying concept did emerge over the course of the NBC musical’s two-hour-and-20-minute running time: If its philosophy could be summed up in one word, "excess" would just about cover it. That's not necessarily a bad thing. But this live show was a lot."

Ratings
Jesus Christ Superstar Live in Concert was the most-viewed program of the night of both network and cable programming. The production earned a 1.7 rating in adults 18-49 in Live + Same Day. Lee Seymour of Forbes said the telecast's ratings were a "step back for NBC's live musicals," explaining "while Superstar Live came out on top for the night's ratings, it still landed near the bottom of the pile, relative to almost every other live musical since NBC revamped the mini-genre in 2013." Jesus Christ Superstar Live in Concert was watched by 9.4 million people. Comparatively, NBC's The Sound of Music Live! was watched by 18.6 million and The Wiz Live! by 11.5 million, while Fox's Grease: Live was watched by 12.2 million. Seymour felt the special may have failed to capture a larger audience on Easter because of its blasphemous themes.

An encore on April 12, 2020, was seen by 3.17 million viewers.

Awards and nominations

Other media

Andrew Lloyd Webber: Tribute to a Superstar

On March 28, 2018, a one-hour special titled Andrew Lloyd Webber: Tribute to a Superstar premiered on NBC in honor of Lloyd Webber's 70th birthday and to promote the coming premiere of Jesus Christ Superstar Live in Concert. In the special, Lloyd Webber was interviewed by Glenn Close, John Legend, and Lin-Manuel Miranda. It also included appearances by some of the performers from Jesus Christ Superstar Live in Concert in various rehearsal scenes from the show.

The special was executive produced and directed by Brad Lachman and written and produced by Matt Lachman. Interviews were conducted at Sardi's restaurant, Power Station recording studio, and the Renaissance Hotel Times Square. Production companies involved in the special included Brad Lachman Productions and Universal Television.

Soundtrack

An official soundtrack was released by Sony Masterworks, digitally on April 6, 2018, and physically on April 27, 2018.

Track listing

Commercial performance
The album debuted at number 46 on the US Billboard 200, earning 13,000 album-equivalent units in its first week according to Nielsen Music, with over 11,000 units coming from traditional album sales. It also debuted at number 3 the same week on the Soundtracks chart, as well as at number 14 on the Top Album Sales chart.

Charts

See also
 2018 in American television
 The Passion: New Orleans, a 2016 television special on Fox

References

External links

2010s American television specials
2018 in American television
2018 soundtrack albums
2018 television specials
American live television shows
Caiaphas
Cultural depictions of Judas Iscariot
Cultural depictions of Pontius Pilate
English-language television shows
Jesus Christ Superstar
Musical television films
Musical television specials
NBC television specials